Cheloniinae is a subfamily of the sea turtle family Cheloniidae. Its parent superfamily is Chelonioidea.

The members of the subfamily, and genera that make it up, are:
 Genus Chelonia
 Chelonia mydas (green sea turtle)
 Genus Eretmochelys
 Eretmochelys imbricata (hawksbill sea turtle)
 Genus Natator
 Natator depressus (flatback sea turtle) (Previously in Chelonia)

External links
 http://home.earthlink.net/~itec5/Testudinata/

Cheloniidae